Vincenzo Barboni (1802–1859) was an Italian painter, mainly depicting sacred subjects in a Neoclassical style.

Biography
Born in Città di Castello, he studied under Giuseppe Crosti. Later he studied with Tommaso Minardi at the Academy of Fine Arts of Perugia. Barboni moved to Rome along with Minardi, where he joined the Academy of St Luke. 
 
Among his other works in Città di Castello are the Martyrdom of St. Lawrence in the town hall, and a Madonna with Saints Eligius and Lucy in the Municipal Art Gallery (Pinacoteca Comunale).
 
He became Director of the Scuola di Disegno e Plastica in Città di Castello. After he died, his pupil Domenico Lambardo became director.

References

1802 births
1859 deaths
People from Città di Castello
19th-century Italian painters
Italian male painters
Umbrian painters
19th-century Italian male artists